Guy Thomas Fisher (born July 21, 1947) is an American convicted racketeer who was once part of  "The Council", an African-American crime organization that controlled the heroin trade in Harlem from 1972 to 1983. He became the first black man to own and operate the Apollo Theater in Harlem when he purchased it in 1977. On October 28, 2020, Guy Fisher was released from federal custody on a medical pardon.

Arrest and conviction
In 1984, Fisher was convicted of multiple counts of RICO violations, including continuing criminal conspiracy, drug trafficking, and murder, and was sentenced to life in prison without eligibility for parole. Fisher's conviction was facilitated by the testimony of his former mentor, associate, and rival, Leroy "Nicky" Barnes. In 1978, Barnes was tried and convicted on multiple racketeering counts and sentenced to life without eligibility for parole. The prosecutor in the case was Rudolph Giuliani, later mayor of New York City. Eleven months after his incarceration, Barnes telephoned Federal prosecutors indicating that he would agree to become a government informant in their case against Fisher and others.  Barnes claimed that he decided to testify because Fisher was having an affair with his mistress. In exchange for his information, Barnes was released into the federal Witness Protection Program.

Personal life
He is uncle to basketball player Corey Fisher.

Popular culture

Music
Fisher has been mentioned in numerous hip hop songs:
Roc Marciano - “Richard Gear”
Gucci Mane - “Dead Man” featuring Young Scooter Trae tha Truth
CamRon - "Get it in Ohio"
Jadakiss - "Shoot Outs" featuring  Styles P
Jae Millz - "Guy Fisher" featuring  Vado
Pusha T - "Alone in Vegas"
Pusha T - "TKO Remix"
Nuk - Woop Like Me

Television

Fisher's life was the subject of a 45-minute documentary entitled The Guy Fisher Story and of an episode of BET's American Gangster.

References

1947 births
Living people
African-American gangsters
American gangsters
American drug traffickers
Gangsters from New York City
Gangsters sentenced to life imprisonment
Criminals from the Bronx
21st-century African-American people
20th-century African-American people